International Day of Light is the day celebrated on May 16. As per UNESCO, it signify to strengthen cooperation and leverage its potential to foster peace and development. Light is a universal symbol of life it plays important role in education, science, art, culture,  sustainable development, communications, energy and medicine. It is celebrated every year. The day is celebrated & observed by UNESCO

History 
This initiative was taken on May 16, 1960 by UNESCO when physicist Theodore Maiman and engineer successfully fired the first laser. Light is important and celebrated because throughout Thousands of years of history, humans are relying on light to see and learn about the universe.  From ancient civilizations to monuments aligning with the constellations. Still, today astronomers are looking and learning about galaxy and the universe.

The study of light helped us to create microscopes, X-ray machines, telescopes, cameras, electric lights, television screens. This help us to transform our world in extraordinary ways.

References 

UNESCO
United Nations days
May observances